This is the first edition of the tournament.

Denis Kudla won the tournament, defeating Matthew Ebden in the final, 6–3, 6–4.

Seeds

  Malek Jaziri (first round)
  Dudi Sela (quarterfinals)
  Blaž Rola (first round)
  Andrey Kuznetsov (quarterfinals)
  Kimmer Coppejans (first round)
  Adrián Menéndez-Maceiras (first round)
  Ivan Dodig (semifinals)
  John Millman (first round)

Draw

Finals

Top half

Bottom half

References
 Main Draw
 Qualifying Draw

Aegon Ilkley Trophy - Men's Singles
2015 Men's Singles